Krishna Gaur Yadav is an Indian politician. She was elected to the Madhya Pradesh Legislative Assembly from Govindpura in the 2018 Madhya Pradesh Legislative Assembly election as a member of the Bharatiya Janata Party. She defeated her nearest rival, Girish Sharma of Indian National Congress by 46,359 votes. She is the first woman ever to be elected as an MLA from Bhopal. She was also the mayor of Bhopal and the chairperson of the Madhya Pradesh State Tourism Corporation.

Political career
In 2005, Gaur was appointed the chairperson of the Madhya Pradesh State Tourism Corporation. She had also served as the mayor of Bhopal.

In 2018, Gaur succeeded her father-in-law, Babulal Gaur in the Madhya Pradesh Legislative Assembly election from the Govindpura seat, which she won by defeating Indian National Congress candidate, Girish Sharma with a margin of 46,359 votes.

Personal life
Gaur was married to Purushottam Gaur, the son of veteran politician Babulal Gaur. Purushottam Gaur died in 2004. She is a businesswoman and social worker residing in Swami Dayananda Nagar, Bhopal.

References

External links
 

1960s births
Living people
Bharatiya Janata Party politicians from Madhya Pradesh
Politicians from Bhopal
Madhya Pradesh MLAs 2018–2023
Mayors of places in Madhya Pradesh